County Road 707 (CR 707) is a designation applied to two segments of road across three counties on Florida's Treasure Coast. The entire road was formerly designated State Road 707 (SR 707) and has been gradually transferred to county jurisdiction.

In St. Lucie County, CR 707 is part of the Indian River Lagoon – Treasure Coast Scenic Highway, a Florida Scenic Highway.

Route description

CR 707 exists in two sections. One extends along Beach Road, a former segment of SR A1A, from US 1 and SR 811 in Jupiter to CR 708 in Jupiter Island. The northern segment follows an old alignment of Dixie Highway from CR 723 in Stuart to SR A1A in downtown Fort Pierce. This segment is also known as Dixie Highway and Indian River Drive and runs parallel to the Florida East Coast Railroad tracks from Fort Pierce to Jensen Beach. Communities served by this segment include Eden, Walton, Ankona, and Eldred.

History
In addition to the two segments of CR 707, SR 707 also included  of Old Dixie Highway from the south end of the Old Roosevelt Bridge in Stuart to the intersection of Savannah Road (CR 723) near Rio, was transferred to the city of Stuart in 2012 or 2013. This segment is not part of CR 707 and is maintained locally.

Unlike the St. Lucie County segment of the former SR 707, the Martin County segment did not parallel the FEC rails as the former alignment of Dixie Highway. This was done by a former alignment of SR A1A, now designated County Road A1A, from Stuart to Jupiter. Former alignments of Dixie Highway in southern Florida include SR 811 and County Road 811 in Palm Beach County, SR 811 and the former SR 5A in Broward County, and SR 909 and the former SR 815 in Miami-Dade County.

The southern segment of CR 707 was formerly designated "SR A1A Alternate" before it was SR 707. This alternate designation still continues south from CR 707's southern terminus along SR 811.

Related routes

Jensen Beach Boulevard

In the 1990s, the Florida Department of Transportation removed the State Road from several routes in the Stuart area, including SR 707A. Jensen Beach Boulevard was then redesignated County Road 732, not to be confused with SR 732, which is the nearby Jensen Beach Causeway. However, conflicting signage on Jensen Beach Boulevard indicates it is part of SR 732, CR 732, as well as County Road 707A. At its westernmost intersection with US 1 it is signed CR 732. At an intersection with Royal Park Drive, the road is signed as SR 732 on a green street sign. At Savannah Road (CR 723), a green sign depicts this intersection as the eastern terminus of SR 732 and the western terminus of CR 707A. (see image at left)

A FDOT-published county map from February 2002 listed the road as solely CR 732. However, the map's 2015 update shows the road as solely CR 707A.

County Road 723 (formerly State Road 723)
The former State Road 723 was also a signed north-south spur of SR 707. A 1.8-mile-long north–south street locally known as Savannah Road, the former State Road (and current County Road 723) extends from an intersection with Dixie Highway (SR 707) and Cardinal Avenue in Rio to an intersection with Jensen Beach Boulevard (former SR 707A/current CR 732) in Jensen Beach.  Savannah Road is primarily a commercial highway even though it is lined with residential developments.  Shopping centers are clustered near its interchange with Jensen Beach Boulevard while business and industrial parks straddle the county road near its southern terminus. State road shields were removed in the 1990s.

Major intersections

References

External links

707
707
707
707
Stuart, Florida
Jensen Beach, Florida
Fort Pierce, Florida